Artistic gymnastics was contested at the 2005 West Asian Games in Doha, Qatar from December 2 to December 4. All events took place at Al-Arabi Indoor Hall.

Medalists

Medal table

References
 Results

External links
 Official Website

2005 West Asian Games
West Asian Games
2005
Artistic gymnastics competitions